Rune Buer Johansen (born 4 September 1973) is a Norwegian footballer.

References
Biography at Ham-Kam

1973 births
Living people
Norwegian footballers
Fredrikstad FK players
Moss FK players
Kongsvinger IL Toppfotball players
Hamarkameratene players
Norway international footballers

Association football midfielders